Georgia Square Mall is a shopping mall located in Athens, Georgia, in United States. Its clientele includes relatively few students attending the nearby University of Georgia, catering primarily to local residents of the Athens area.

History
Opened in 1981, this two-level mall was originally noted for its retro design features including the foil-copper look used on the mall entrance to Belk. This was also one of the largest more rural malls in the country in the era it was built.  The mall also opened with other anchors Davison's, Sears and JCPenney. The anchors to the mall had originally been in Downtown Athens and relocated when it opened.

In 2007, the mall began a renovation to the exterior entrances in the rear as well as an updated look on the interior. However, even with two overhauls, the mall is now much like it was when it opened. The only anchor change was in the name of Davison's; it was converted to Macy's in 1986, Rich's in 1998, Rich's-Macy's in 2003 and back to Macy's in 2005. As of February 2017, Macy's has closed. As of Tuesday August 6, 2019, Sears just announced it will be closing its doors down this fall for good as part of a plan to close 26 stores. On June 4, 2020, JCPenney announced that it would be closing as part of a plan to close 154 stores nationwide. After JCPenney closed in October 2020, Belk became the only remaining anchor store.

In early 2022, an Athens construction syndicate proposed a mixed-use development for the site of the mall, which would include more than 1,000 residential apartments and almost  of new retail and restaurant space.  Some of the existing retail space, including the sole remaining anchor store, Belk, would be retained, but the rest of the mall would be demolished.

Anchors

Current
 Belk (127,381 sq ft.)

Former
 Davison's (115,623 sq ft.) (b Macy's in 1986, then Rich's in 1998, Rich's-Macy's in 2003, Macy's in 2005; closed in 2017)
 Sears (91,000 sq ft.) closed in 2019
 JCPenney (97,550 sq ft.) closed in October 2020

References

External links
 Georgia Square Mall (official site)
 Sky City: Georgia Square Mall

Buildings and structures in Athens, Georgia
Shopping malls in Georgia (U.S. state)
Shopping malls established in 1981
Tourist attractions in Athens, Georgia